Joel Almeida may refer to:

Joel Ayala Almeida (born 1946), Mexican politician
Joel Almeida (basketball) (born 1985), Cape Verdean and Portuguese basketball player